Club Deportivo Marquense, or simply Marquense, is a Guatemalan football club based in San Marcos, Department of San Marcos, and who compete in the Primera División de Ascenso, the nation's second footballing division, since 2000. Their home venue is at the Estadio Marquesa de la Ensenada.

History
The club was founded in 1958, and were promoted to the then Liga Mayor "A" in 1962, remaining in the First Division until 1966, when they finished last or relegation place. They were relegated down as the Segunda Division (third tier in the country), before earning promotion to the Primera División de Ascenso in the 1990s. After more than three decades competing in lower divisions, the team was promoted to the Liga Nacional in May 2000, and they reached the semi-finals of the 2004 Apertura tournament. They finished second in the 2006 Clausura tournament, their best result ever, reaching the final and eliminated by the defending champion Municipal.

Marquense qualified to the UNCAF Club Tournament for the first time in their history after finishing above the loser of the 2005 Apertura final, Comunicaciones, in the overall standings. The team reached the semi-finals of the 2006 UNCAF tournament, where they lost to Costa Rican club Puntarenas, but after beating Victoria of Honduras in the third place match on a 4–1 aggregate, they were able to reach the CONCACAF Champions' Cup for the first time in their history. Marquense played Pachuca, the Mexican First Division defending champions, in the 2007 CONCACAF Champions' Cup quarter-finals, with Pachuca winning the first leg 2–0 at home on February 22, 2007 and 1–0 in San Marcos on 28 February 2007, thus eliminating the Guatemalan team on a 3–0 aggregate.

In the 2007 Clausura tournament, Marquense reached the final, facing Xelajú MC, who won the title on a 4–2 aggregate score. It was the first time since 1980 that two teams from out of Guatemala City finished as champions and runner-up.

Honours

Performance in CONCACAF competitions
Copa Interclubes UNCAF: 1 appearance
2006–07 - Third Place

CONCACAF Champions' Cup: 1 appearance
2006–07 - Quarter-finals

Primera División de Ascenso
Champions (1): Apertura 2021

Squads

Current squad

Retired numbers
4 –  Marcos Menaldo, defender (2017-2022)

List of Coaches
 Adan Onelio Paniagua 
 Miguel Angel Puppo 
 Francisco Melgar 
 César Eduardo Méndez 
 Francisco Melgar 
 Aldo da Pozzo
 Joaquín Álvarez

Old logo

External links
 Official web site
 History of Deportivo Marquense
Team profile on Polish Football Clubs Database 

Marquense
Association football clubs established in 1958
1958 establishments in Guatemala
San Marcos Department